Cave Hill, St. Michael, is a suburban area situated in the parish of Saint Michael, Barbados.  It is located about 4 km north-west of the capital city Bridgetown, along the west coast of Barbados.

The University of the West Indies at Cave Hill, one of the general campuses of the University of the West Indies (UWI) system, is located here.

University of the West Indies at Cave Hill 

The Cave Hill Campus overlooks the island’s capital, Bridgetown, five miles away. Despite its expansion in recent years, the campus maintains much of its original architecture of simple, low-rise buildings. The scenic attractiveness and relatively small size of the university community creates an inviting, intimate and friendly atmosphere. Since 2004, the Cave Hill campus is the site of the West Indies Federal Archives Centre.

References

External links 

 University of the West Indies - Cave Hill campus website
 The Cave Hill School of Business
 Satellite view of the Cave Hill campus
 Map of the UWI Cave Hill Campus

Education in Barbados
Populated places in Barbados
Saint Michael, Barbados
Universities and colleges in Barbados